Wilf Gentzen (born 3 April 1963, in Melbourne) is an Australian professional light welter/welterweight boxer of the 1980s and '90s who won the Victoria (Australia) State welterweight title, Australian welterweight title, Commonwealth welterweight title, and was a challenger for the World Boxing Council (WBC) International light welterweight title against Tony Jones, his professional fighting weight varied from , i.e. light welterweight to , i.e. welterweight.

Professional boxing record

References

External links

1963 births
Light-welterweight boxers
Living people
Boxers from Melbourne
Welterweight boxers
Australian male boxers
Commonwealth Boxing Council champions